Lynn Township is one of twenty-four townships in Henry County, Illinois, USA.  As of the 2010 census, its population was 745 and it contained 311 housing units.  Lynn changed its name originally from Linn Grove Township to Lynnville Township on April 13, 1857, and then again from Lynnville to Lynn on an unknown date.

Geography

Unincorporated towns
 Lynn Center at 
 Ophiem at 
(This list is based on USGS data and may include former settlements.)

Adjacent townships
 Western Township (north)
 Osco Township (northeast)
 Andover Township (east)
 Clover Township (southeast)
 Oxford Township (south)
 Rivoli Township, Mercer County (southwest)
 Richland Grove Township, Mercer County (west)
 Rural Township, Rock Island County (northwest)

Cemeteries
The township contains these two cemeteries: Lynn Center and Swedona.

Major highways
  Interstate 74
  U.S. Route 150
  Illinois Route 81

Demographics

School districts
 Alwood Community Unit School District 225
 Orion Community Unit School District 223

Political districts
 Illinois's 17th congressional district
 State House District 71
 State Senate District 36

References
 United States Census Bureau 2008 TIGER/Line Shapefiles
 
 United States National Atlas

External links
 City-Data.com
 Illinois State Archives
 Township Officials of Illinois

Townships in Henry County, Illinois
Townships in Illinois